Vata is a genus of beetles in the family Cicindelidae, containing the following species:

 Vata gracilipalpis (W. Horn, 1909)
 Vata thomsoni (Perroud, 1864)

References

Cicindelidae